Family Of Thakurganj  is a 2019 Indian Hindi-language action drama film directed by Manoj K. Jha, and produced by Ajay Kumar Singh. The film stars Jimmy Sheirgill and Mahie Gill, and follows the influence of modern society on traditional values in a typical family.  Principal photography of the film began in October 2018 in Lucknow,

Cast
Family of Thakurganj is an upcoming Bollywood movie of 2019 which will be released on 19 July and has the undermentioned cast.
Jimmy Sheirgill as Nannu
 Rama Mishra as Rima
Mahie Gill as Sharbati
Saurabh Shukla as Baba Bhandari
Sudhir Pandey as Jagat Chacha
Supriya Pilgaonkar as Sumitra Devi
Pavan Malhotra as 	SP Rathore
Mukesh Tiwari as Badri Pathak
Nandish Singh as Munnu
Yashpal Sharma as Sajjan Singh
Pranati Rai Prakash as Suman 
Raj Zutshi as Ballu Thapa
Salil Acharya as Murali
 Kalpesh Rajgor as Bambam
 Shivika Sodiyan as Lali
 Priya Mishra as Lata
 Manoj Pahwa as Gagan Guru
 Harshit Gupta as Shankar
 Vishal Singh as young Nannu
 Eshu as young Munnu
 Sujal as young Riaz
 Ramesh Chandra Pathak as Lala
 Ajay Singh as Dashrath
 Mayank Narayan as Head Police Officer
 Rakesh Dubey as constable Vaibhav Yadav

Soundtrack 

The music of the film is composed by Sajid–Wajid and lyrics by Danish Sabri.
The rap for song "Fancy Thumke" was by Parry G. The songs are rendered by Mika Singh, Sonu Nigam, Shreya Ghoshal, Dev Negi and Jyotica Tangri.

References

External links

 

2010s Hindi-language films
Films shot in Lucknow
Films set in Lucknow